An Quang Pagoda (meaning: "Temple of the Light of the (Dharma) Seal") in Master Van Hanh Street is a meeting place for Vietnamese Buddhist leaders in Ho Chi Minh City and is a site of the Institute for Dharma Propagation.  It has been at the focus of development of modern Vietnamese Buddhism as the seat of the School of Buddhist Studies and the headquarters of the Unified Buddhist Church of Vietnam.

Since its founding in 1948, its buildings have been expanded in number and size; they now include a library and a publishing house.  But the importance of the pagoda lies in the large number of Dharma teachers who started from this place and the thousands of monks and nuns who received their training there.

Today the pagoda serves as the headquarters of the Ho Chi Minh City Buddhist Sangha and it may serve as a place of reconciliation between the (underground) Unified Buddhist Church of Vietnam (UBCV) and the Communist Party and government who oppose it.

References

Religious buildings and structures completed in 1948
Pagodas in Vietnam
Buddhist temples in Ho Chi Minh City
20th-century Buddhist temples
1948 establishments in Vietnam
Unified Buddhist Church Buddhists